Giovanni Raffaele Badaracco (1648–1726) was an Italian painter of the Baroque period. He was born in Genoa, son and pupil of the painter Giuseppe Badaracco. After studying some time under his father he went to Rome, and entered the school of Carlo Maratta. He also painted in Naples and Venice, then returned to Genoa.

Among his main paintings the two large pictures that depict St. Bruno in the church of San Bartolomeo at Certosa, in the Genoese district of Rivarolo, the paintings in the Oratory of Assunta, nearby the church of Coronata, in the district of Cornigliano, considered his masterpiece and those in the church of Nostra Signora del Carmine in Genoa, that depict “Carmelites Saints” and “Virgin Mother and St. John”.

Notes

References

 Clario Di Fabio, Gio.Raffaele Badaracco. Qualità e industria, in “Bollettino dei Musei Civici Genovesi”, XIV, 40–42, 1992, pp. 61–91

1648 births
1726 deaths
17th-century Italian painters
Italian male painters
18th-century Italian painters
Italian Baroque painters
Painters from Genoa
Pupils of Carlo Maratta
18th-century Italian male artists